The Ballarat Junior Technical School was a junior division of the Ballarat School of Mines. It opened in 1913 in a bluestone building in the grounds of Dana Street Primary School. In 1921 it moved to a custom built school in the grounds of the Ballarat School of Mines.

The Ballarat Junior Technical School is a predecessor institution of Federation University Australia.

Notable alumni 

 Dave McGrath (footballer, born 1899)

See also 

 Federation University Australia

Notes

References

External links 
 Federation University Australia, formerly University of Ballarat

Education in Ballarat